Concordia "Comodoro Pierrestegui" Airport , also known as Concordia Airport, is a domestic airport serving Concordia, Entre Ríos, Argentina.

Airlines and destinations

Accidents and incidents
15 November 1975: On approach to the airport inbound from Buenos Aires, an Aerolíneas Argentinas Fokker F28-1000, tail number LV-LOB, struck tree tops  short of the runway, causing the nosegear to contact the ground first, shearing off both the nose and the nosegear. There were no reported fatalities, but the aircraft was damaged beyond repair and was written off.

See also

Aerolíneas Argentinas accidents and incidents
List of airports in Argentina

References

External links

Airports in Argentina
Concordia, Entre Ríos